Wilmington is the name of two places in the U.S. state of Illinois:
Wilmington, Greene County, Illinois
Wilmington, Will County, Illinois